Spin echo small angle neutron scattering (SESANS) measures structures from around 20 to 2000 nm in size. The information is presented as a real-space (similar to g(r)) as opposed to a reciprocal space (q(r)) mapping. This can simplify the interpretation for some systems. 
SESANS is useful for studying processes that occur over relatively long time scales, as data collection is often slow, but large length scales. Aggregation of colloids, block copolymer micelles, Stöber silica particles being a prime examples.

The technique offers some advantages over SANS but there are fewer SESANS instruments available than SANS instruments. Facilities for SESANS exist at TUDelft (Netherlands) and Rutherford Appleton Laboratory (UK).

References

Materials science
Analytical chemistry
Scientific techniques